ProFootballTalk, often known solely by its acronym PFT, is a website covering news from the National Football League. The site has a blog format with short posts that usually include links to the original source of the news along with some commentary and analysis.

History
The site was created on November 1, 2001, by Mike Florio, who is also the site's primary editor and contributor. , primarily site contributors include Florio, Michael David Smith, Josh Alper, Myles Simmons and Peter King.

On June 14, 2009, it was announced that ProFootballTalk would become an affiliate of NBC Sports, which would hold exclusive rights to PFT content although Florio would retain ownership.

PFT Live 

PFT Live is an online sports radio show began in 2015. , it features Mike Florio and Chris Simms. On August 11, 2020, it was announced that the site will stream exclusively on Peacock on August 24, 2020.

Notable errors
ProFootballTalk posted and thus spread the unconfirmed rumor on January 25, 2007 that broadcaster and former Pittsburgh Steelers quarterback Terry Bradshaw had died in a car accident. This proved to be incorrect.

A similar instance occurred on September 14, 2009 when the crew of Profootballtalk.com erroneously reported a quote from Keyshawn Johnson in referring to Joe Flacco as a "bum". A correction to this was posted on the September 15.

See also
PFT Commenter

References

External links
Profootballtalk.com website

Internet properties established in 2001
National Football League websites